Château de Lacaze is a château in Landes, Nouvelle-Aquitaine, France. It dates from the 14th century.

Houses completed in the 14th century
Châteaux in Landes (department)